The Stanier Class 3P 2-6-2T was a class of London, Midland and Scottish Railway (LMS) steam locomotive.  They were designed by William Stanier based on the earlier LMS Fowler 2-6-2T.

Overview 

A taper-boiler versions of Henry Fowler's 1930 design, the general dimensions were the same with some improvements. They were under-boilered and although improved they were always considered to be indifferent performers. In some ways they were inferior to their predecessors. The cab was of Stanier's usual excellent design with the coal bunker built higher than the rear cab windows but angled inwards to avoid them, thus giving good visibility when running bunker first.

The first 2 lots (117 and 126, locomotives 71–144) were built with number 6 domeless boilers but the rest were built with improved 6A boilers with separate top-feed and steam dome. Both types of boilers were later modified to carry Adams ‘Vortex’ blastpipe to improve steaming. These locomotives could always be identified by the larger diameter chimney. 
 
The 139 locomotives were numbered 71–209 by the LMS, and after 1948 BR renumbered them 40071–209. The LMS classified them 3P.

In a final attempt to improve the locomotives, six were rebuilt with larger 6B boilers; these were 169 in 1940, 163 in 1941, 148 and 203 in 1942, and 40142 and 40167 in 1956. The re-boilering was not considered to be cost effective.

They were to be found on various duties – stopping train, suburban passenger routes, branch line, empty stock and banking.

They are generally considered to be the least successful of Stanier's standard designs.

Detail

Withdrawals 
The class was withdrawn between November 1959 and December 1962, with the last of the large boiler variant (40148) having been withdrawn in September 1962. None were preserved.

References

External links 

 Class 3P-B Details at Rail UK

3 Stanier 2-6-2T
2-6-2T locomotives
Railway locomotives introduced in 1935
Scrapped locomotives
Standard gauge steam locomotives of Great Britain